Murak (also Romanized as Mūrak; also known as Mūrag) is a village in Padena-ye Vosta Rural District, Padena District, Semirom County, Isfahan Province, Iran. At the 2006 census, its population was 1,080, in 245 families.

References 

Populated places in Semirom County